Sven "Sven-Pelle" Pettersson (15 December 1911 – 6 January 2000) was a Swedish swimmer and water polo player who competed in the 1928 Summer Olympics and in the 1936 Summer Olympics.

In 1928 he was eliminated in the first round of the men's 100 m freestyle competition. As a member of the Swedish relay team he finished fifth in the men's 4 × 200 m freestyle relay event.

Eight years later he was part of the Swedish water polo team which finished seventh in the water polo tournament. He played three matches. As a member of the Swedish relay team he finished eighth in the men's 4 × 200 m freestyle relay event.

References

1911 births
2000 deaths
Swedish male water polo players
Olympic swimmers of Sweden
Olympic water polo players of Sweden
Swimmers at the 1928 Summer Olympics
Swimmers at the 1936 Summer Olympics
Water polo players at the 1936 Summer Olympics
Swedish male freestyle swimmers